Anne Schellekens (born 18 April 1986, in Rotterdam) is a Dutch female rower.

She won the bronze medal at the 2012 Summer Olympics in the women's event.

References 

1986 births
Living people
Dutch female rowers
Olympic rowers of the Netherlands
Rowers at the 2012 Summer Olympics
Olympic bronze medalists for the Netherlands
Olympic medalists in rowing
Sportspeople from Rotterdam
Medalists at the 2012 Summer Olympics
Coxswains (rowing)
21st-century Dutch women